Gulbranson is a surname. Notable people with the surname include:

 Carl August Gulbranson (1831–1910), Norwegian businessman and politician
 Ellen Gulbranson (1863–1947), Swedish operatic soprano 
 Hans Gulbranson (1787–1868), Norwegian business

See also 

 Gulbrandsen
 Gulbransen